Guarinus is a given name. Notable people with the name include:

Guarinus of Sitten (1065–1150), Bishop of Sion and saint
Guarinus of Palestrina ( 1080–1158),  Bishop of Palestrina and saint